Al Harazin served as the New York Mets assistant general manager from 1986 to 1990, and from 1992 to 1993 he served as their general manager.

References

Baseball America

Major League Baseball general managers
New York Mets executives
Living people
Year of birth missing (living people)